Stewart David Nozette (born May 20, 1957) is an American planetary scientist, technologist, and consultant who worked for the United States Department of Energy, the United States Department of Defense, DARPA, the United States Naval Research Laboratory,  and NASA. He is also a convicted felon for attempted espionage and fraud against the United States. The FBI arrested him October 19, 2009, charging him with attempted espionage after a sting operation which Nozette's lawyer claims amounted to entrapment. At trial, Nozette admitted attempting to sell U.S. classified information to someone he believed was an Israeli Mossad operative, but was in reality an undercover Federal Bureau of Investigation employee. He pleaded guilty to one charge of attempted espionage and was sentenced, under the terms of a plea bargain, to thirteen years in prison. After serving time at the Federal Correctional Institution, Terre Haute, Nozette was scheduled for release from the U.S. federal prison system in November 2020 and was released on November 13th 2020.  The FBI found no evidence that any classified materials were actually released to anyone outside the US Government.

Personal life and education
Nozette was born in Chicago, Illinois, on May 20, 1957, to Helen and Morris Nozette. He grew up in Chicago’s  West Rogers Park neighborhood and earned a B.S. in geosciences with honors and distinction (University of Arizona, 1979), and a Ph.D. in Planetary sciences  (Massachusetts Institute of Technology, 1983). He worked a couple of summers in the 1970's as a guide-lecturer at the Museum of Science and Industry (Chicago) while he was home from the University of Arizona.

Career
In 1983-1984 Nozette was co-director of the California Space Institute, affiliated with the Scripps Institution of Oceanography at UC San Diego. From there he went to the University of Texas as an Assistant Professor of Aerospace Engineering Austin, Texas.

In the early 1990s, Nozette, as part of the Strategic Defense Initiative's 'Brilliant Pebbles', conceived the idea (and then led the mission) of the Clementine spacecraft as a means to both provide a test bed for the development of lighter, more cost effective advanced space technology, as well as to obtain  data for the Moon.
Nozette and colleagues' bistatic radar results from Clementine claimed to support the discovery of water on the south pole of the moon.  Although the significance of the result was questioned, measurements made by subsequent Lunar missions have supported the hypothesis that the Moon holds substantially greater reserves of water than had been thought based on Apollo program results and confirmed Nozette's original findings.  The engineering model of the Clementine spacecraft, which Nozette worked on, hangs in the Air & Space Museum in Washington, DC.

Over the course of his career, Nozette held high level security clearances and worked on sensitive United States nuclear and satellite programs.  He held a Q clearance, top secret clearance, and was read into multiple special access programs. He held Top Secret security clearances to study nuclear material with the United States Department of Energy, and was on the National Space Council under President George H. W. Bush. From 1989 to 2006, Nozette held a security clearance as high as top secret and handled documents relating to national security. He left the employ of the U.S. government in 2006.

Nozette worked as a technical consultant for Israel Aerospace Industries between 1998 and 2008.  After he left the government job, Nozette was heavily involved in India's extraterrestrial Moon probe, Chandrayaan-1. He was a principal investigator of the Mini-RF instrument on the Lunar Reconnaissance Orbiter and a co-investigator on Chandrayaan-1.

Espionage and arrest
Nozette was under investigation by the Justice Department for possible fraudulent billing on a NASA contract by a nonprofit corporation he ran, "Alliance for Competitive Technology". An unnamed NASA Inspector had allegedly been found billing to NASA for expenses including, among other things, three mortgages, nine credit cards, a Tennis club, pool cleaning, and the Mercedes-Benz Credit Corporation. Documents found by the Justice Department while investigating this allegation included classified documents and an e-mail in which Nozette "threatened to take a classified program on which he worked to an unnamed foreign country or Israel."  This information was passed along to the FBI.

In September 2009, Nozette began receiving phone calls from a person claiming to be an agent of Mossad. In reality this was an undercover FBI agent. Nozette expressed a willingness to exchange American intelligence for financial rewards. His first payment was received upon his answers to a list of questions regarding American satellite technology for public access GPS. The information he claimed he would hand over included classified information. A folder left for this contact in a post office box contained "information classified as both top secret and secret that concerned US satellites, early warning systems, means of defense or retaliation against large-scale attack, communications intelligence information, and major elements of defense strategy." The United States Department of Justice criminal complaint, however, does not charge that "the government of Israel or anyone acting on its behalf committed any offense under U.S. laws."

According to the criminal complaint, Nozette told his espionage contact that his parents were Jewish, and therefore claimed a right to return under Israel's Law of Return. He also asked allegedly for two million dollars and a passport.

Nozette reached a plea bargain with prosecutors and pleaded guilty to a single count of espionage, as well as pleading guilty earlier to the charges of fraud and tax evasion. He was sentenced to thirteen years of prison. Held in custody since his arrest in [2009], Nozette received credit for the time he has already served. Nozette was released 13 November 2020.  He is currently working on his memoir "Cat's Paw" which describes his experiences from his perspective for the first time.

Honors
 NASA Exceptional Achievement Medal 1994 for his conception and execution of the Clementine mission
 National Space Society’s Space Pioneer Award for 1994
 Rotary National Award for Space Achievement
 National Space Club Nelson P Jackson Award
 Aviation Week and Space Technology 1994 Aerospace Laurel Award for outstanding achievement in the field of Space
 1995 Space Frontier Foundation Vision to Reality Award
 X-Prize Foundation New Spirit of St. Louis Award

Selected publications

Notes

References

External links
Nasa Site
The FBI Sting Video
Nozette Indian Experience
FBI Criminal Complaint USA v Stewart David Nozette
Nozette Plea Agreement
Nozette Sentencing Memo-Espionage
Nozette Sentencing Memo-Fraud

1957 births
Living people
Scientists from Chicago
Planetary scientists
Massachusetts Institute of Technology School of Science alumni
University of Arizona alumni
21st-century American physicists
Lawrence Livermore National Laboratory staff
Nuclear secrecy
Incarcerated spies
Espionage scandals and incidents
American people convicted of spying for Israel
American people convicted of attempted spying against the United States